My Mercedes Is Bigger than Yours is a 1975 novel by Nigerian writer Nkem Nwankwo. It was published among the influential African Writers Series.

References 

1975 Nigerian novels
African Writers Series